Cydonia may refer to:

Music 
 Cydonia (album), a 2001 album by The Orb
 "Cydonia", a track by heavy metal band Crimson Glory from Astronomica

Places and jurisdictions 
 Kydonia or Cydonia, an ancient city state on Crete, at modern Chania
 Roman Catholic Diocese of La Canea, a Latin Catholic titular see, reviving the Italian curiate name of the former diocese of La Canea at the above city of Chania

Science 
 Cydonia (Mars), a region of the planet Mars known for the "Face on Mars"
 1106 Cydonia, an asteroid in the main asteroid belt between Mars and Jupiter
 Cydonia, a genus of plants in the rose family

Other
 Cydonia, a name for the ancient Greek goddess Athena

See also